Mazen Al-Johani (born 29 June 1995) is a Saudi Arabian professional footballer who plays for Hubuna as a forward.

Career
Al-Johani started his career at Ohod and is a product of the Ohod's youth system. ent up with Ohod from the Saudi Second Division to the Saudi First Division in the 2014-15 season . and ent up with Ohod from the Saudi First Division to the Saudi Professional League in the 2016-17 season . On 23 November 2017, Al Johani made his professional debut for Ohod against Al-Raed in the Pro League, replacing Abdulhaleem Al-Amoudi .

Career statistics

Club

References

External links 
 

1995 births
Living people
Saudi Arabian footballers
Ohod Club players
Hubuna FC players
Saudi Professional League players
Saudi First Division League players
Saudi Second Division players
Saudi Fourth Division players
Association football forwards